Carl Czerny's Rondino on a Theme of Auber for Piano Quintet, Op. 127 was published by Diabelli around 1826. Scored for a standard piano quintet (Piano, 2 Violins, Viola, Cello), the composition is what the composer would have dubbed a "brilliant" piece, intended to show off the skills of the piano soloist in a concert setting.

Structure

The composition consists of a single multi-tempo movement divided into two sections, the F major Introduction (Marked: Andante) and the A major Rondino (Marked: Allegretto grazioso - Allegro vivace).

References

Notes

Sources

External links
 

Compositions by Carl Czerny
Czerny
1826 compositions
Compositions in F major
Compositions in A major